For information on all Jacksonville University sports, see Jacksonville Dolphins
The Jacksonville Dolphins football program was the intercollegiate American football team for Jacksonville University located in the U.S. state of Florida. The team competed in the NCAA Division I Football Championship Subdivision (FCS) and were members of the Pioneer Football League.  The team played its home games at the 5,000 seat D. B. Milne Field in Jacksonville, Florida.  On December 3, 2019, the university announced it would discontinue its football program, effective immediately.

History

Conference affiliations
 Division I Independent (1998–2000)
 Pioneer Football League (2001–2019)

Bowl games

Awards

Pioneer Football League Offensive Freshman of the Year
 Josh McGregor, QB, 2008

Pioneer Football League Defensive Player of the Year
 Tyrone Wright, DB, 2001

Pioneer Football League Coach of the Year
 Kerwin Bell, 2008

Notable former players
 Dallas Jackson -  Arena Football League player
 Andy Jones - NFL player
 E. J. Nduka -  Arena Football League player, and WWE professional wrestler
 Billy Peach - CFL player
 Micah Ross - played basketball and football at JU, playing in 1998 on the football team. Became the first former JU football player to play in the NFL, appearing with the Jacksonville Jaguars, San Diego Chargers and Carolina Panthers.
 Lin-J Shell - CFL player
 Will Weatherford - played defensive end at Jacksonville. Speaker of the House of Florida.

Championships

Conference championships

Divisional championships
From 2001–2005, the Pioneer Football League was divided into North and South Divisions. As winners of the Pioneer Football League's South Division, Jacksonville has made one appearance in the Pioneer Football League Championship Game, in 2001. The Dolphins also shared the Division title with Morehead State in 2004, but the tie-breaker allowed the Eagles to represent the division in the championship game.

References

External links
 

 
American football teams established in 1998
American football teams disestablished in 2019
1998 establishments in Florida
2019 disestablishments in Florida